Arnaldo Ouana (born 22 December 1969) is a retired Mozambique international football player and current football coach.

Arnaldo Ouana spent most of his career playing in the Mozambique football league, primarily with Clube de Desportos da Costa do Sol. He had a brief spell playing in Liga de Honra with Campomaiorense.

Arnaldo Ouana made several appearances for the Mozambique national football team, including three appearances at the 1996 African Cup of Nations finals. He also played in two 1994 FIFA World Cup qualifying matches.

He was placed in charge of the Mozambique under-20 national football team for the 2016 COSAFA U-20 Cup.

References

External links

1969 births
Living people
Mozambican footballers
Mozambican expatriate footballers
Mozambique international footballers
1996 African Cup of Nations players
S.C. Campomaiorense players
Liga Portugal 2 players
Expatriate footballers in Portugal
Mozambican expatriate sportspeople in Portugal
CD Costa do Sol players
Association football forwards